Patrice Cellario (born November 21, 1953) is a Monegasque nuclear physicist and civil servant. He serves as Monaco's Interior Minister.

Early life
Patrice Cellario was born on November 21, 1953 in Monaco. He was educated in Monaco, attended prep school in Marseille, and graduated from the Grenoble Institute of Technology. He earned a PhD in Physics.

Career
Cellario started his career at the Centre d'études nucléaires in Grenoble.

Cellario became a civil servant in Monaco in 1982, where he worked on telecommunications. He was engineering manager of the Stade Louis II from 1985 to 1988. He was the deputy director of Monaco Public Works from 1990 to 1992, and its director from 1992 to 1998. He then served as the director of Monaco's Environment, Urban Affairs and Construction from 1998 to 2000, followed by Monaco's Foresight and Studies on Urban Affairs from 2001 to 2008, and Monaco's Foresight, Urban Affairs and Mobility from 2008 to 2009. He served as the chief executive of Monaco's Department of the Interior from 2009 to 2015.

Cellario has served as Monaco's Interior Minister since April 4, 2015.

Personal life
Cellario is married, and he has three children.

References

Monegasque scientists
Monegasque Interior Ministers
Nuclear physicists
1953 births
Living people
Grenoble Institute of Technology alumni
20th-century physicists
21st-century physicists